Hartismere was a hundred of Suffolk, that later gave its name to a poor law union, a rural sanitary district, and the Hartismere Rural District.

Listed as Hertesmere in the Domesday Book, the name of the hundred is derived from "Hart's mere" where Hart is a personal name.

Hartismere also gives its name to the 11-19 Co-educational Foundation School based in Eye. It serves pupils aged 11–16 years whilst the associated sixth form college instructs 16-19 year students. The School is distinctive in having particularly close links to the Hartismere Community. It is also the name of a hospital and maternity unit at Eye.

Parishes

Hartismere Hundred consisted of the following 32 parishes:

References

Hundreds of Suffolk